Jung Jae-yoon (정재윤; born May 28, 1981) is a South Korean footballer. He played for FC Seoul, and later became a scout for the team.

References

1981 births
Living people
South Korean footballers
FC Seoul players
FC Seoul non-playing staff
K League 1 players
Hongik University alumni
Association football midfielders